The Malasakit Center refers to a chain of one-stop-shop centers for medical and financial assistance provided by various agencies of the Philippine government.

History
The Malasakit Center program was started by the Office of the Special Assistant to the President, led by Bong Go following a directive of President Rodrigo Duterte. The center is meant as a one-stop shop for government medical assistance for indigent Filipinos. The first Malasakit Center opened in February 2018.

When Go was elected Senator in 2019, he continued to promote the Malasakit Center; authoring a bill in the Senate that would institutionalize the center. President Duterte signed into law on December 3, 2019, the Malasakit Center Act, also known as Republic Act No. 11463. As per law, the government is obliged to establish Malasakit Centers in all hospitals under the Department of Health and the Philippine General Hospital. The legislation also authorizes the Philippine National Police to set up of such facilities.

Services

Eligible indigent Filipinos can avail multiple subsidies from various government agencies in Malasakit Centers. Prior to the establishment of Malasakit Centers, indigents had to fill up multiple documents and go to separate government offices to lessen their medical expenses.

The Malasakit Center processes the availing of subsidies from the following government agencies:

Department of Health
Department of Social Welfare and Development
PhilHealth
Philippine Charity Sweepstakes Office
Philippine Amusement and Gaming Corporation

Branches
As of March 4, 2022, there are 151 Malasakit Centers across the Philippines.

References

Medical and health organizations based in the Philippines
2018 establishments in the Philippines
Presidency of Rodrigo Duterte
Government aid programs